Promise Me is a novel by Harlan Coben. It is the eighth novel in his series of a crime solver and sports agent named Myron Bolitar.

Plot 
It has been six years since entertainment agent Myron Bolitar last played superhero. In six years he hasn’t thrown a punch. He hasn’t held, much less fired, a gun. He hasn’t called his friend Win, still the scariest man he knows, to back him up or get him out of trouble.

All that is about to change... because of a promise.

The school year is almost over. Anxious families await word of college acceptances. In these last pressure-cooker months of high school, some kids will make the all-too-common and all-too-dangerous mistake of drinking and driving. But Myron is determined to help keep his friends’ children safe, and so he makes two neighborhood girls promise him: If they are ever in a bind but are afraid to call their parents, they must call him.

Several nights later, the call comes at 2:00 am, and true to his word, Myron picks up one of the girls, Aimee Biel, in midtown Manhattan and drives her to a quiet cul-de-sac in New Jersey where she says her friend lives.

The next day, the girl’s parents discover that their daughter is missing. And that Myron was the last person to see her. Desperate to fulfill a well-intentioned promise turned nightmarishly wrong, Myron races to find her before she’s gone forever. But his past will not be buried so easily - for trouble has always stalked him, and those he loves are the ones who suffer. Now Myron must decide once and for all who he is and what he will stand up for if he is to have any hope of saving a young girl’s life.

Dr Edna Skylar is revealed as the source for the disappearance as Aimee was involved with her estranged son, Drew Van Dyne, a teacher at Aimee's school who gets her pregnant. She was trying to keep her from her strict father, Erik, who would have wanted a termination. The other missing girl, Katie Rochester, runs away from her father to be with her boyfriend Rufus but returns home.

American thriller novels

2006 American novels
Novels by Harlan Coben
Novels set in New York City

he:מיירון בוליטר#ספרי הסדרה